Robert Mathew Frew (born 28 December 1970) is a New Zealand former cricketer. He played in 35 first-class and 10 List A matches for Canterbury from 1995 to 2003.

See also
 List of Canterbury representative cricketers

References

External links
 

1970 births
Living people
New Zealand cricketers
Canterbury cricketers
People from Darfield, New Zealand
Cricketers from Canterbury, New Zealand